Tadanao (written: 忠直, 忠尚 or 忠愨) is a masculine Japanese given name. Notable people with the name include:

, Japanese daimyō
, Japanese daimyō
, Japanese daimyō

Japanese masculine given names